Veronica continua is an upright, woody herb with blue flowers in dense clusters at the end of branches and leaves arranged in opposite pairs.  It is endemic to Tasmania.

Description
The leaf margin entire, smooth except for stiff white, small hairs near the base, mid-vein on upper surface impressed, prominent on the underside.

Taxonomy and naming
Veronica continua was first formally described in 2006 by Barbara Briggs and the description was published in Telopea. The specific epithet (continua) means "continuous" or "unbroken" with reference to the stems continuing to grow after flowering.

Distribution and habitat
This species grows on rocky hillsides, damp woodlands, occasionally wet sclerophyll forests and cliff edges in north-east Tasmania, mostly in and near Douglas Apsley National Park.

References

Flora of Tasmania
continua
Endemic flora of Tasmania